Jørpeland Church is a parish church of the Church of Norway in Strand Municipality in Rogaland county, Norway. It is located in the town of Jørpeland. It is the church for the Jørpeland parish which is part of the Ryfylke prosti (deanery) in the Diocese of Stavanger. The large, gray, concrete church was built in a rectangular design in 1969 using designs by the architects Turid and Kristen Bernhoff Evensen. The church seats about 450 people.

See also
List of churches in Rogaland

References

Strand, Norway
Churches in Rogaland
20th-century Church of Norway church buildings
Churches completed in 1969
1969 establishments in Norway